The 2016 SheBelieves Cup was the inaugural edition of the SheBelieves Cup, an invitational women's soccer tournament held in the United States. It took  place between March 3 and 9, 2016, before the 2016 Summer Olympics.

Teams

Squads

Format
The four invited teams played a round-robin tournament.

Points awarded in the group stage followed the standard formula of three points for a win, one point for a draw and zero points for a loss.

Venues

Results
The schedule was announced in January 2016.

Goalscorers
2 goals
 Alex Morgan

1 goal

 Toni Duggan
 Leonie Maier
 Anja Mittag
 Babett Peter
 Crystal Dunn
 Samantha Mewis

Own goal
 Gilly Flaherty (playing against Germany)

References

External links

2016
2016 in women's association football
2016 in sports in Florida
2016 in sports in Tennessee
Sports competitions in Tampa, Florida
Sports competitions in Nashville, Tennessee
Sports in Boca Raton, Florida
2015–16 in French women's football
2015–16 in English women's football
2015–16 in German women's football
2016 in American women's soccer
Soccer in Florida
Soccer in Tennessee
March 2016 sports events in the United States